Amir Schelach (born 11 July 1970) is a former Israeli footballer who represented the Israel national football team 85 times.

Honours
Israeli Premier League (3):
1991-92, 1994-95, 1995-96
Israel State Cup (3):
1994, 1996, 2001
Toto Cup (1):
1992-93

Personal life
Amir's parents were both basketball players, his father is Shimon "Zinga" Shelah, a legendary player and coach in Hapoel Tel Aviv who in 1960 took the Israeli Basketball championship as the head coach of Hapoel. Shimon was also capped 21 times for the Israel national basketball team and in 1965 was appointed as the head coach of the Israel national basketball team and under his guidance Israel qualified to 4 consecutive EuroBasket and finally in 1971 he left the national team.

Amir was married to Adi Shum, the daughter of Itzhak Shum.

These days Amir is working in architecture and design with Idan Shum.

References

External links
 
 

1970 births
Living people
Israeli Jews
Israeli footballers
Israel international footballers
Maccabi Herzliya F.C. players
Maccabi Tel Aviv F.C. players
Beitar Jerusalem F.C. players
Hapoel Haifa F.C. players
Maccabi Netanya F.C. players
Liga Leumit players
Israeli Premier League players
Footballers from Tel Aviv
Israeli people of Polish-Jewish descent
Association football defenders